The Mind of Mannie Fresh is the debut studio album by Mannie Fresh. It was released December 21, 2004 under Cash Money Records. The album debuted at #59 then peaked at #47 on Billboard 200, selling over 70,000 copies in its first week of release

Track listing

Charts

Weekly charts

Year-end charts

References

2004 debut albums
Mannie Fresh albums
Albums produced by Mannie Fresh
Cash Money Records albums
Universal Records albums
Albums produced by David Banner